Carlos Ischia (born 28 October 1956 in Buenos Aires) is a former Argentine footballer.

Playing career
Ischia played for Chacarita Juniors and Vélez Sársfield in Argentina as well as representing the Argentina national football team.

In 1984 Ischia moved to Colombia where he played for América de Cali and Junior. He retired in 1989 due to injury.

Managerial career
Ischia was field assistant for Carlos Bianchi at Vélez Sársfield and Boca Juniors before becoming first team coach at Vélez.

In 2004, Ischia was appointed as manager of Gimnasia de La Plata. In 2005, he took over at Junior in Colombia, but left later that year due to differences with the directors and constant media pressure. In 2007, he was appointed the new manager of struggling Rosario Central, but after 14 games of the Apertura 2007 Ischia re-signed with the club at the bottom of the table and perilously close to the automatic relegation places.

In December 2007, Ischia was appointed as the new manager of Boca Juniors after the resignation of Miguel Ángel Russo. On 23 December 2008, his team managed to avoid a two-goal defeat against Club Atlético Tigre to win the Apertura 2008 championship. On 27 May 2009 Boca Juniors  announced that Ischia would quit as manager at the end of the Clausura 2009 tournament, he was replaced by Alfio Basile. He replaced Ricardo Lavolpe on 1 January 2010 to become the head coach of Mexican club Club Atlas. In mid-2011, Ischia became the new manager of Deportivo Quito, making his debut in Ecuadorian football. He held this post until 14 May 2012.

In August 2013, Ischia was back coaching in Argentina, taking charge of Racing Club, replacing newly sacked head coach Luis Zubeldía.

In 2014, Ischia was named as the new coach of Barcelona Sporting Club.

Managerial titles 
Boca Juniors
 Primera División Argentina: Apertura 2008
 Recopa Sudamericana: 2008

References

External links
 
 

1956 births
Living people
Footballers from Buenos Aires
Argentine footballers
Argentina international footballers
Association football defenders
Chacarita Juniors footballers
Club Atlético Vélez Sarsfield footballers
Atlético Junior footballers
América de Cali footballers
Argentine Primera División players
Categoría Primera A players
Argentine expatriate footballers
Expatriate footballers in Colombia
Argentine football managers
Club Atlético Vélez Sarsfield managers
Club de Gimnasia y Esgrima La Plata managers
Rosario Central managers
Boca Juniors managers
Atlético Junior managers
Atlas F.C. managers
Barcelona S.C. managers
S.D. Aucas managers
The Strongest managers
Delfín S.C. managers
S.D. Quito managers